The Tony Kornheiser Show is a sports podcast talk show out of Washington, D.C., hosted by Tony Kornheiser, which was originally a sports radio talk show appeared on WTEM  from 1992 to 1997; on ESPN Radio between 1998 and 2004; back on WTEM from 2004 to 2006; and on WTWP and then WWWT in 2007 and 2008; and back on WTEM from 2009 and 2016.

The show also appeared on XM Satellite Radio between February 28, 2005, and April 28, 2006, between March 5, 2007, and June 28, 2007, and between January 21, 2008, and June 27, 2008.

In 2012, Kornheiser was ranked No. 8 as the 100 most important sports talk radio hosts in America by Talkers Magazine. In 2016, Kornheiser was ranked No. 1 as America's Top 20 Local Sports Midday Shows for 2015 by Barrett Sports Media.

History

WTEM (1992–1997) 

When The Tony Kornheiser Show launched on May 25, 1992, the show was originally produced by Mitch Levy.  The sports director on WTEM, Andy Pollin, was both sidekick and news reporter of the show. Greg Garcia (who would later create the sitcom My Name is Earl) worked as a board operator on the show.  After three months, Gary Braun succeeded Garcia as the board operator.

At the beginning, Kornheiser basically had two rules and a mission statement:

 No athletes as guests because Kornheiser thought their interviews are boring and hard to get the points Kornheiser wants.
 When callers called in, Kornheiser requested them to go straight to the topic without pleasantries.  If a caller asks "how are you doing?" a "Banned from the Tony Kornheiser Show" soundbite would be played and that call would end.
 Kornheiser's mission statement: help your friend, crush your enemy, and have free food.

Kornheiser dislikes "how are you doing?" to start a call; he prefers that callers and e-mailers have funny and creative comments: John from D.C. always said "T.K. Stack Money" when he called in; Steve the Sycophant from Virginia, always said "Tony, my liege and idol" on the phone.

When Andy Pollin did the news update, Kornheiser often interrupted him with his comments on the news.  During the first few years, Kornheiser would let a then WTEM traffic reporter Janet Elliott (then called Janet Delaney or Janet O'Connor, and also known as Janet "From Another Planet") sing show tunes in a segment and then praise her. During the show, the sales representatives of WTEM sent free food to the studio, which prompted Kornheiser to say, "This show is about free food." If the food was not delivered on time, Kornheiser would go ballistic on the air.

Because Kornheiser needed to focus on writing his Style column in the Washington Post weekly, he usually did not host the show on Thursdays. Usually Andy Pollin, the Sports Director at WTEM, would guest-host Tony's Show on Thursdays.  Between November 1995 and December 1996, Warner Wolf was named the guest host of the Tony Kornheiser Show on Thursdays until he moved to New York City as a sports anchor on WCBS-TV. Other Thursday guest hosts were Kevin Kiley, Johnny Holliday, the voice of the Maryland Terrapins, Al Koken, etc.

Late in this tenure, Kornheiser started to read emails from his listeners. This segment was called Tony's Mailbag. The jingle introducing the segment was sung by Gary Braun, a member of the original incarnation of the show. He always ended his radio show by saying "If you're out on your bike tonight, do wear white" as a tribute to the Rolling Stones.

The last show before he moved to ESPN Radio was broadcast on November 14, 1997.

ESPN Radio (1998–2004)
The Tony Kornheiser Show on ESPN Radio debuted on January 5, 1998. The show aired between 1 pm and 4 pm ET.  The original producer was Denis Horgan, Jr. and the sports update was anchored by Dan 'The Duke' Davis.  Because of Kornheiser's duties in The Washington Post, The Tony Kornheiser Show had two studios: one in Washington, D.C. where Kornheiser and Pollin lived and the other in Bristol, Connecticut, where the producing staff and Davis stayed.

One of the features of the show was that when Davis reported the updates, Kornheiser would interrupt the Duke's updates and make comments.  At first the Duke was not amused with Kornheiser's interruptions and it took Davis a while to get used to it.  Later on they found chemistry and Tony described the Duke as the glue of the show.

During the first two years, Kornheiser did not host the show when he wrote a column for ESPN The Magazine. Andy Pollin, Bob Ryan of The Boston Globe, or others would guest-host the show.

On November 16, 1998, WTEM moved The Tony Kornheiser Show to the 4–7 p.m. slot as a tape delay show.  Kornheiser did not like the idea because he would lose the callers from the WTEM broadcasting area.

On September 13, 1999, ESPN Radio moved The Tony Kornheiser Show to his favorite 10 am-1 p.m. ET slot to make room for The Dan Patrick Show.  WTEM accommodated the move by reducing The Jim Rome Show to 2 hours. Jim Rome was furious at the move. He voiced his displeasure on the air, attacked Kornheiser and demanded WTEM give him his third hour back.  Kornheiser responded to Rome's attack by his usual sarcastic humor.  The producing staff of The Tony Kornheiser Show even played several Rome parodies.  The "Snackdown" was one of the most famous parodies in the history of The Tony Kornheiser Show.  Two phrases, "Clahhsic!" and "Epic!", both said in a tone mocking Rome, became the staples of The Tony Kornheiser Show.  Also, Kornheiser's nickname "Mr. Kornmissioner" was derived from this segment.  Kornheiser also mocks Rome's "tour stops" from time to time on his show, and states that Rome's "takes" are not his own opinions, but rather made-up opinions from staff members that he pays to write his takes.

Tony's Mailbag concluded the show on ESPN Radio with Kornheiser reading emails from his listeners.  The jingle introducing the segment still used the version sung by Gary Braun.  The music that plays in the background during this segment is "Tea for Two Cha Cha" by Roy Battle (pronounced Bah-tell by Tony) and the Altones.  The band is dubbed "The official house band of the Tony Kornheiser Show".  Later on, Gadget White and opera singer Denyce Graves created alternate opening jingles for this segment.

Although The Tony Kornheiser Show is a sports-talk show, Kornheiser spends a lot of segments discussing current events, music, entertainment and life surrounding himself, including his dog, Maggie.  During Fridays Tony would discuss movies with either Stephen Hunter or Joe Barber of WTOP.  His love of the music in 1960s inspired a radio segment called Old Guy Radio.  His other-stuff talk makes his talk show much more interesting when there is no big sports event.  In essence, his non-sports talk becomes a talk show version of his Washington Post Style Section columns.  A collection of memorable clips of witty, sarcastic, or funny sayings from famous movies, television shows, callers, interviewees, and cast members have been turned into sound bites that are played regularly on the show, depending on the situation and circumstance.

Kornheiser, a self-admitted agitator stemming from his time as a young adult in the late 1960s, would do many things to provoke wrath from his bosses, fellow ESPN employees, (especially the on-air TV "heads") and from ESPN Radio's usual core audience, which only wanted intense sports talk as opposed to stories about how to cook a chicken, his mischievous Brittany spaniel, Maggie, whether or not the Packers would win on Sunday (a statement used by emailers to mock hardcore sports fans which exists to this day), or him kvetching about the people he dislikes, his old age, his kids, and his lack of hair.

The on-air TV "heads" were featured prominently on the show in a comedic game called the ESPN Fantasy Head League.  It is based on fantasy sports leagues, except the athletes consist only of ESPN/ABC sports personalities.  The people who appeared regularly on the show (Andy, Phil Ceppaglia, Kevin Stanfield, Ray Necci and Kornheiser himself) participated in a mock fantasy draft of the on-air personalities, which featured people such as Dan Patrick, Mike Tirico, Stuart Scott, Dana Jacobson, and Neil Everett.  Each person on the show would earn points for the types of shows each head appeared on.  More points were given to higher profile spots, such as the 11 pm SportsCenter, or an ABC Sports program.  Proof of his agitative nature occurred during his second mock fantasy draft.  Management heard about the draft and immediately pulled the activity while Tony's show was in commercial.

In late 2001, Kornheiser decided to leave the microphones on when his show went to a commercial break, as a treat to his internet radio listeners.  The result was the infamous yet wildly popular "Internet Show", where online listeners could hear what the people on the show really thought about sports, entertainment, politics, and other stuff.

Two popular internet show segments involved Rich Eisen telling the Bea Arthur joke, and Kornheiser ripping an angry emailer who proclaimed that he hated Tony's show.  Eisen heard the Bea Arthur joke at the Friar's Club comedy roast of Jerry Stiller in 1999, where the joke was told by Jeffrey Ross.  Kornheiser's tirade against the angry emailer, red89hawk@aol.com, was peppered with foul language and vitriolic sentiment, a hallmark of the Internet Show, and Kornheiser's rants in general.  The red89hawk segment also featured an E-mail Jihad, a barrage of angry emails from listeners directed at the person criticizing Kornheiser.  The Internet Show was a forum of real emotions from real people engaging in informal conversations, and would regularly contain explicit topics and foul language.  As Kornheiser once said during the Rich Eisen internet show segment, "That's why we always say, this is the X-Rated portion of the show."

The Internet Show was canceled on January 4, 2002, when it was alleged that racist remarks were made during one of the segments.  It was reinstated in February 2002.  The Internet Show was pulled off the air for good in the summer of 2002, when show producer Denis Horgan Jr., a friend of Kornheiser, was fired for inappropriate e-mail conduct.  Tony criticized management on the air for Horgan's firing, and was subsequently suspended from ESPN Radio for one week.  This suspension became known as Kornheiser's "Vacation" when the topic of his "disappearance" arose.  The continuous arguments with ESPN Radio management led to Kornheiser's departure.

Ray Necci replaced Horgan as the show's producer in the summer of 2002. 14 months later, Chadd Scott replaced Necci as producer. Kornheiser's last show on ESPN Radio was aired on March 26, 2004.

WTEM (2004–2006) and Extreme XM (2005–2006)
On November 10, 2004, Kornheiser returned to WTEM with the cast of
 Andy Pollin (co-host and news reporter)
 Gary Braun (co-host)
 Keven Sheehan (news reporter)
 Marc Sterne (producer, who is nicknamed "Nigel" and uses a British accent. His authenticity was questioned on March 24, 2006, but had proof that he was from England, showing his English Badge on Channel 8.  However, the authenticity of his daily appearances on Channel 8 is also in extreme doubt, so the mystery remains). Actually, the origins of the "Nigel" character can be traced to an episode of the show in which Tony was reflecting on a story he'd seen the night before that was similar to the kind of contests on Man vs. Beast, a Mr. Tony favorite. Gary Braun said that he and Marc Sterne had reconstructed the origins of story (it was a program from England involving little people and lions or something like that). Braun and Sterne then launched into a very funny skit in which it was posited that the entire program was the result of an English bar bet.  But, so taken was Tony with Sterne's British accent that he asked him to read all the sports updates in that accent.  He nicknamed that character "Nigel" and after a while, ceased referring to Sterne by his actual name, and referred to him exclusively as "Nigel".  From time to time, actual Englishmen would write into the show asking after Nigel's credentials saying things like: "He sounds a little like Dick Van Dyke in Mary Poppins, is he for real?" at which point Tony, ever the one to push the inside joke, insisted that not only was Nigel for real, but he was in the country illegally.  This incident is typical of the show, in that it is a long-running inside joke that the listener has to have been in on for some time.  (The mocking of Jim Rome and the constant references to the non-existent simulcast on Channel 8, two of the others.)

The show was heard online on SportsTalk 980 from 9 am to 11 am ET, after which the show was repeated until 1 pm ET. XM Satellite Radio began broadcasting the show on February 28, 2005, from 11 am through 1 pm on Extreme XM. Since Clear Channel programs Extreme, Kornheiser was not compensated for this additional venue.

In this tenure, The Tony Kornheiser Show included a sports score update segment that was called "Andy Polley's Happy Funtime Sports Extravaganza".  The Extravaganza was usually the sports update at 20 minutes past the hour during the second hour of the show, and was introduced by carnival music and a random soundbite from the show's database.  Also, Darius Rucker of Hootie and the Blowfish  recorded another version of the opening jingle for Tony's Mailbag.

During this time, the holdovers from the ESPN message board days, referred to as bloggers by Kornheiser, held a members-only golf tournament on August 1, 2005. Kornheiser spent time in the months before the tournament, which he dubbed "The First and Last Annual Nerds in Paradise Golf Closed Invitational" (derided by Gary Braun using the acronym "FAGLAP"), trying to make deals with golf courses and hotels in the Washington DC area for the best deal. Finally, the winning host emerged as Reston National Golf Club, in Reston, Virginia. They, led by hotel manager Mark Driscoll, gave the bloggers the "Mr. Tony Treatment," including an extravagant dinner after the golfing that evening. To the shock of people like Andy Polley and Kevin Stanfield, noted curmudgeon Kornheiser was visibly moved by the whole affair. Some of the better-known bloggers that attended were AJ in Nashville, Korry in Virginia, and Brandon Borzelli, who Kornheiser noted wrote the funniest emails in the show's history.

The Tony Kornheiser Show on WTEM ended on April 28, 2006, so that Kornheiser could change his sleep schedule to accommodate his future role as the color analyst on ESPN's Monday Night Football. Kornheiser had stated that he planned on returning to radio after the NFL Football Season. From time to time, Kornheiser would call in to his replacements, Andy Pollin and Steve Czaban, to discuss matters such as The Sopranos, American Idol, and 24.

WTWP/WWWT and XM Sports Nation (2007 and 2008)
After completing the 2006 season on ESPN's Monday Night Football, Kornheiser considered offers from WTEM and WTWP to return to the Washington, DC area radio airwaves.

On January 23, 2007, Kornheiser decided to go to WTWP to host The Tony Kornheiser Show.  Effective February 20, 2007, The Tony Kornheiser Show aired live on weekdays from 8:30 to 10:30 am, with a repeat that aired immediately afterward (on Fridays the last half-hour was preempted by The Politics Program). WTWP is owned by Bonneville International and programmed in conjunction with The Washington Post.

The deciding factor for Kornheiser to join WTWP was his desire to work for a station affiliated with The Washington Post, where he had been since 1979.

For the new incarnation of the show, Kornheiser retained Marc "Nigel" Sterne as producer. Andy Pollin and Gary Braun remained at WTEM and Triple X ESPN Radio, respectively. The main cast of the show included:
 Brennan Haselton, the news reporter
 Joe Barber, the entertainment editor of WTOP
 David Aldridge of The Philadelphia Inquirer and TNT when Barber is away
 Jeanne McManus, former food editor of The Washington Post, a.k.a. "my dear friend Nancy" in Kornheiser's Washington Post Style columns.
McManus appeared on Mondays, Wednesdays and Fridays.  In McManus's absence, Sally Jenkins, Liz Clarke, Tracee Hamilton of The Washington Post, or Janet Elliott would fill in.  Kevin Stanfield filled in when either Barber or Aldridge was away. Arch Campbell, movie critic of WJLA-TV, and John Feinstein also made cameo appearances as co-hosts.  On May 9, 2007, for the first time in the show's history on WTWP, there were only female co-hosts when McManus and Clarke co-hosted the show with Kornheiser.  Before that show, Clarke said Kornheiser was in the middle of "the estrogen sandwich."  It happened again the next day when Hamilton and Jenkins were co-hosts, where Kornheiser called himself "the meat of the estrogen sandwich."

Several frequent guests on the show had been limited by their affiliation with ESPN; Kornheiser had stated on-air (most recently on March 13, 2007) that ESPN management enacted a policy that prevents ESPN employees and commentators—the majority of whose work appears on ESPN—from appearing as guests on stations that compete with ESPN Radio affiliates.  ESPN has since relaxed this limitation as it applies to Kornheiser.  Before speaking with Mel Kiper, Jr. on April 10, 2007, Kornheiser said, "we have dispensation to have a certain amount of ESPN people on."

Because the show was broadcast on a long-form talk radio station, Kornheiser was not required to focus primarily on sports.  As a result, this incarnation of the show focused more on pop culture, entertainment, news headlines, and the daily lives of Tony and his co-hosts.  The last show in 2007 was on June 28, 2007, signalling Tony's return to the Monday Night Football booth for the 2007 season.  Kornheiser vowed to return to WTWP in 2008 and "do the radio seriously."  As a tradition when quitting the show from ESPN Radio and WTEM, the last show before hiatus ended by playing "Famous Last Words" by Billy Joel.  With the demise of Washington Post Radio on WTWP, and the Post affiliation being the key reason Kornheiser joined the station, it was initially unclear whether or not the show would return. However, Kornheiser agreed to return to the station, now known as WWWT, beginning January 21, 2008. The show aired live from 8 am to 10 am and is replayed from 2 pm to 4 pm

The Tony Kornheiser Show also aired on XM Satellite Radio Channel 144, and was available in the United States and Canada, from 9 am to 11 am from March 5, 2007 to June 28, 2007.  XM carried the show again, in a live time slot (8-10 a.m.) between January 21, 2008, and June 27, 2008.

Starting with the January 23, 2008 edition of the show on 3WT, various listeners and celebrities would do the opening voiceover for the show.  Tony aired his dislike of the current 3WT voiceover guy on the January 22, 2008 edition of the show.  As a result, he invited his listeners to record an mp3 of the opening sequence ("Previously on the Tony Kornheiser Show..." and "The Tony Kornheiser Show is on now, on 3WT") and submit that recording to Nigel.  The list of contributors has included:

-Greg Tantum (3WT program director)
-Washington D.C. Mayor Adrian Fenty
-Dennis Bounds (one of the chief newscasters for Seattle's KING-TV)

The Tony Kornheiser Show went off the air on June 27, 2008, as Kornheiser prepared for Monday Night Football. However, on August 11, 2008, because of the format change, WWWT was canceled and Bonneville stated it would no longer will air The Tony Kornheiser Show.

WTEM (2009–2016)
On May 18, 2009, ESPN announced that Kornheiser stepped down from the Monday Night Football booth and was replaced by former Oakland Raiders and Tampa Bay Buccaneers head coach Jon Gruden, which swirled a lot of rumors where Kornheiser would host a radio show. Then Kornheiser decided to return to WTEM, which was broken on Twitter by Jim Zinzi, a longtime Kornheiser listener whose wife ran into Kornheiser at the beach. Effective September 8, 2009, The Tony Kornheiser Show aired live on weekdays from 10 am to 12 pm

This incarnation retains the "softcore sports talk format" from the previous one at 3WT.  On every show, Kornheiser and producer "Nigel" are joined by two rotating co-hosts, usually a "guy chair" and a "chick chair." The main cast of characters include:

 David Aldridge (co-host) of Turner Sports
 Gary Braun (co-host) of WTEM and Vice President of Braun Films & Video, Inc.
 Chris Cillizza (co-host) of The Washington Post
 Liz Clarke (co-host) of The Washington Post
 Torie Clarke (co-host), former  Assistant Secretary of Defense for Public Affairs
 Jeanne McManus (co-host), formerly of The Washington Post
 Kevin Sheehan (news reporter) of WTEM
 Scott Linn (news reporter) of WTEM
 Marc "Nigel" Sterne (producer)

Other notable guest co-hosts include:
 Kim Burton, wife of Gary Braun and former radio host on WASH-FM
 Arch Campbell, former movie critic for WJLA-TV
 Lindsay Czarniak of ESPN 
 Howard Fineman of The Huffington Post
 Mike Freeman of Bleacher Report
 Tracee Hamilton of The Washington Post
 Leon Harris of WJLA-TV
 Sue Palka of WTTG-TV
 Adam Ferrara, actor, host, and comedian 
 Bill Simmons of ESPN and Grantland
 Wendy Rieger of WRC-TV
 Andy Pollin of WTEM
 Luke Russert of NBC News
 Kevin Stanfield of WTEM
 Pam Ward of ESPN

The new incarnation also saw the debut of several new features, including:

 Daily PTI preview with PTI producer Matt Kelliher
 Every Thursday or Friday during the football season, Ron Jaworski and James Carville offer their picks to select NFL and college football games. Jaworski's picks are then compared against those of the show's resident monkey Reginald in a showdown called "Jaws vs. the Monkey." The other running in joke is Carville's seemingly made up lines on sports games. In 2012, with Carville unavailable at the start of the football season, Courtney Cummz started to offer one pick to select an NFL game.
 Winter weather forecast by Sheehan, usually announcing between late November and early December.
 Starting February 27, 2013, the mailbag theme songs are played by the listeners submitted to the show in the MP3 format. Inspired by the creativity of the listeners, the show held a contest for giveaways. Later on it became a regular feature.

The WTEM show was available immediately after airing via podcast on iTunes. Previously, between May 27, 2011, and March 20, 2015, the show had to wait 24-hours to distribute the podcast due to contract restrictions, which was ridiculed by Kornheiser's loyal listeners, and was a frequent joke on his program. Fans started a #FreeMrTony hashtag and complained frequently to the station.

On March 23, 2015, Kornheiser announced the podcast of his radio show would now be available without a 24-hour delay.

On May 2, 2016, the Tony Kornheiser Show moved to 11:00 a.m. through 1:00 p.m. to make room for the new morning show Cooley & Sheehan, hosted by Chris Cooley and Kevin Sheehan. Scott Linn replaced Sheehan as the news reporter.

On June 2, WTEM announced that Kornheiser would do his last show on WTEM near the end of June 2016. Kornheiser said that he would launch a podcast in September 2016. Kornheiser said in a statement, “I have loved every minute on the radio at WTEM, but I felt it was time to pursue a new and appealing challenge. I will be launching a podcast this September. I am excited that this endeavor will allow me to continue to work with so many of the people who have been a part of my radio show for over the past 20 years. But I will miss all of my friends and colleagues at WTEM.” On Kornheiser's last show aired on June 28, 2016, Kornheiser said,

"I’m gonna miss pretty much people my age, but you should understand this: the opportunity to do this, I walked away from two years left on a contact ... I don’t know what is being written or what is being said, but the truth of the matter is, I walked away with two years left on a contract, which at my age is so stupid and an indefensible position. And why did I do it? Because I thought it might be nice to see if I could get [not] people to pay for it on a daily basis, but advertisers who I could bring them a certain amount of listeners: smart, funny, affluent people all around the country. Maybe we could get ads. Maybe we could get a sponsor from all around the country."

Podcast-Only (2016-Present)
The show relaunched as a podcast-only show on September 6, 2016. According to Kornheiser on June 6, 2016, the reason to do a podcast-only show was to own his content and did podcast a little closer to his home, but the show format would still be the same as the radio show. As for what will be different, Kornheiser said his new podcast will probably be 60 to 70 minutes instead of the 80 minutes he fills on his radio show. Kornheiser's son, Michael, would be the executive producer and handled the social media (@ThisShowStinks on Twitter) for the podcast and launched a website (www.tonykornheisershow.com) with information about how to subscribe.

The podcast-only show is produced in partnership with sports talent agency IMG and on-demand audio company DGital Media.

All co-hosts from the previous WTEM show moved with Kornheiser to the podcast-only format. Sheehan returns to appear annually on the podcast to give his "Winter Weather Forecast".

The podcast was initially recorded at a private studio, but in 2017 moved to a reserved space within Chatter (a restaurant Kornheiser co-owned with former University of Maryland basketball coach Gary Williams, TV personality Maury Povich, and philanthropist Alan Bubes) in the Friendship Heights neighbourhood of Washington, D.C.  Production at the restaurant allowed for direct personal interaction with fans visiting the restaurant for breakfast, as the podcast is typically recorded in the morning. Following the closure of Chatter in 2019, production was shifted once again to a private recording studio. With the onset of gathering restrictions due to the global COVID-19 pandemic in early 2020, production moved to Kornheiser's personal residence (where he also remotely records Pardon the Interruption for ESPN) in the Chevy Chase neighbourhood of Washington, D.C. At that time, the Twitter feed for the show stopped being maintained and the main core of co-hosts that featured on the most recent WTEM incarnation of the program stopped appearing regularly on the show. Since that time, they have only appeared very sporadically via call-in.

As of 2022, the show is regularly produced with only Kornheiser, his son Michael, and producer Marc "Nigel" Sterne appearing on the podcast with two call-in guest segments per episode. It is released approximately three times a week (typically Monday, Wednesday, and Friday) but ultimately subject to Kornheiser's personal schedule and whims. The podcast is available at 11 a.m. ET via iTunes, Google Play, Spotify, Stitcher, TuneIn, and ART19.

Famous fans of the show include Adam Ferrara, Ian Kahn, Tom Cotton, Brian Polian, and Barry Levinson.

WSBN (2019-Present)
WSBN announced that it would air the Kornheiser's podcast show starting September 10, 2019. The truncated podcast show airs between 12 p.m. through 1 p.m. weekdays.

Frequent call-in guests

Current
 Andrew Beyer of The Washington Post
 James Carville, political consultant and author
 Chuck Culpepper of The Washington Post
 Ron Darling, color commentator for the New York Mets
 Mark Feinsand of MLB.com
 Adam Ferrara, actor, host, and comedian
 Pat Forde of Sports Illustrated
 Greg Garcia, TV producer/creator and formerTony Kornheiser Show board operator
 Neil Greenberg of The Washington Post
 Ann Hornaday of The Washington Post 
 Sally Jenkins of The Washington Post
 Richard Justice of Texas Monthly 
 Tim Kurkjian of ESPN
 Jason La Canfora of WJZ-FM
 Abbe Lowell, defense attorney
 Jeff Ma, Microsoft executive and co-host of Bet the Process
 Booger McFarland of ESPN
 Buster Olney of ESPN
 Jeff Passan of ESPN
 Bob Ryan, retired from The Boston Globe
 Jason Samenow of The Washington Post
 Steve Sands of The Golf Channel
 Charley Steiner, play-by-play announcer for the Los Angeles Dodgers
 Barry Svrluga of The Washington Post
 Chuck Todd of NBC News 
 Michael Wilbon of ESPN
 Brian Windhorst of ESPN

Past
 Mitch Albom of Detroit Free Press
 Fred Barbash of The Washington Post
 Joe Barber of WTOP
 Dan Barreiro of KFAN
 Thomas Boswell of The Washington Post
 Norman Chad of ESPN
 David DuPree of USA Today
 Tarik El-Bashir of Comcast SportsNet Washington
 John "Junior" Feinstein, author
 Howard Fineman of HuffPost
 Stephen Hunter, retired from The Washington Post 
 Ron Jaworski of ESPN 
 Larry King of CNN
 Mel Kiper, Jr. of ESPN
 Dan Le Batard of The Miami Herald
 Mike Lupica of New York Daily News
 Mark Maske of The Washington Post
 Al Michaels of NBC Sports
 Brent Musburger of ESPN and ABC Sports
 Joe Morgan, formerly of ESPN
 Rachel Nichols of ESPN
 Jim O'Connell of The Associated Press
 Dick Schaap, formerly of ESPN
 Dan Shaughnessy of The Boston Globe
 Dave Sheinin of The Washington Post
 Ron Sirak of Golf World
 Sam Smith of ChicagoBulls.com
 Pam Ward of ESPN
 Greg Cote of The Miami Herald
 Lisa de Moraes, formerly of The Washington Post 
 Marc Fisher of The Washington Post
 Mike Freeman of Bleacher Report 
 Andy Greenwald, formerly of Grantland
 Bob Kravitz of The Athletic
 Ray Ratto of Comcast SportsNet Bay Area
 Bill Livingston of The Cleveland Plain Dealer

Famous catch phrases, nicknames, references, and soundbites

 Help your friends, crush your enemies, and get a good table at a restaurant: The oft-repeated mission statement for the show.
 36-inch waist: The claimed pant size of John Feinstein that Tony ridicules as a gross misuse of vanity sizing. 
 Activate your glutes!: The shows insistence that athletic performance can be enhanced by "activating your glutes" as emphasized by Tiger Woods proclaiming that he couldn't perform due to his inability to activate his glutes at the 2015 Farmers Insurance Open.
 Aloha Tower: A long defunct Chinese restaurant located in Valley Stream, New York frequented by the local Jewish population. Both Kornheiser and Los Angeles Dodgers broadcaster Charley Steiner share memories of frequenting it with their families as children and now share custody of a small promotional calendar/thermometer given away by the restaurant that dates from the late 1960s. Possession of the calendar/thermometer is exchanged biannually at a ceremony performed at the DC location of The Palm restaurant.
 Andy Polley: The nickname given to co-host Andy Pollin when his name was mistakenly mispronounced in an argument with an irate caller. It was later revealed during the course of the show that Pollin's annual clothing budget was $200, providing a source for many enduring cheapskate jokes. 
 Avocados: Thr purported favorite produce item of ESPN baseball reporter Tim Kurkjian. Kurkjian mentioned a minor affinity for avocados in passing during an on-air conversation about stocking up at a supermarket for a future storm event. This quickly turned into listeners deluging Kurkjian with avocado references in his daily life, going as far as asking him to autograph actual avocados at public appearances. 
 The answers to all your questions is money: Kornheiser often uses this quote by NBC Sports executive Don Ohlmeyer to rationalize any strange and illogical decision that sports figures or television executives may make. 
 Beltway Mitterrand: Kornheiser's nickname for Washington Nationals relief pitcher Sean Doolittle who supports socialist political causes, in reference to former socialist French president Francois Mitterrand.
 Bootsie, the Hammer, and the Captain: The nicknames for the three masculine Kornheiser grandchildren (Walker, Henry, and Reed) all fathered by Michael Kornheiser. 
 Camp Keeyumah: A Jewish sleepaway camp in the Pocono Mountains of Pennsylvania that Kornheiser attended in his youth. The camp is often the subject of very specific memories and anecdotes. Hall of Fame NBA coach Larry Brown was one of Kornheiser's camp councillors. 
 Cheeseboy: Tony's derisive nickname for Dan Steinberg, author of The Washington Post blog D.C. Sports Bog, for allegedly stealing his ideas.
 Chesapeake Bay Bridge: Kornheiser possess an irrational fear of being stuck in his car on large bridges over open water. This must be often confronted when travelling between his home in Washington, D.C. and his vacation home in Rehoboth Beach, Delaware, which requires frequent trips over the Chesapeake Bay Bridge.
 Chessie: Kornheiser's current dog, a mixed-breed rescue. Chessie is the frequent subject of various anecdotes involving dog-walking, frisbee eating, and sod destruction. Chessie can often be heard barking in the background of the podcast. Kornheiser previously had a Brittany spaniel named Maggie that ate everything, including $20 bills.
 Choking dogs: A dishonorable moniker applied to any sports team that habitually loses in the face of near victory. This label was most notably repeatedly applied to the Washington Capitals prior to their 2018 Stanley Cup Finals victory. 
 Cillizza Seats: The first row of seating behind the catcher at Nationals Park, frequented by show co-host Chris Cillizza.
 Clean out the mouse cages, Harry, and carry the urine specimens upstairs: Purported title of Kornheiser's upcoming novel in which he crushes his enemies. The "Harry" in question is believed to be Harry Jaffe of Washingtonian Magazine, who claimed that Kornheiser was unavailable to comment on a story he was writing, when in fact he had never contacted Kornheiser.
 C'mon man. What we doin' out here man?: A soundbite of Washington Redskins linebacker Brian Orakpo questioning the effort of his teammates while on the sidelines. The quote and soundbite is used any time someone on the show questions the outcome of a poor decision. Similar sentiment and usage was extended to a soundbite of Formula 1 racing driver Sebastian Vettel exclaiming "What the f@*k are we doing here?!" through his helmet microphone.
 Connective tissue: The term used by Kornheiser to describe the robust community and connections created by the show in an organic manner without any direct action by Kornheiser himself. 
 Courtney: The mononym used by the show for adult film star Courtney Cummz, who used to call in to the show with her NFL picks on a weekly basis during the show's final WTEM version. Her stage surname was never used on the broadcast of the show. The juxtaposition of her profession versus that of fellow show NFL prognosticator James Carville was often played up to great comedic effect by all parties.
 Crack-Dealing Point Guard: An often used reference to the ineptitude of the Binghamton Bearcats Men's Basketball team, once embroiled in a scandal where their starting point guard, Tiki Mayben, had been arrested for dealing cocaine. 
 The Browseabout: An unpretentious book shop located in Rehoboth Beach, Delaware, where Kornheiser owns a vacation home. The shop has long been used as a reference by Kornheiser for the assumed location of the ultimate final iteration of the show where he sits around idly kvetching with friends but where the show is no longer recorded or broadcast to anyone except passers-by in the bookstore.
  David Aldridge Moment: A reference to the feeling Kornheiser gets when he sees someone he knows personally on television. The origin of this was regularly seeing frequent show co-host David Aldridge on Turner Sports NBA broadcasts. This saying has now been extended to listeners every time they have an interaction with anyone even remotely connected to the show (co-hosts, guests, emailers, Loyal Littles, Bigs, etc.)
 Death Star Radio: A term used by Kornheiser to describe the show's tone when he is setting up to crush someone, usually in service of a personal vendetta. It is often accompanied by the playing of the Imperial March from The Empire Strikes Back.
 Do you know who I am?: A reference used when Kornheiser discusses his position in popular culture and how to use it to his advantage, often accompanied with a soundbite of Alex Rocco's performance of the line as Moe Greene in The Godfather. The origin of this reference goes back to when John Feinstein portrayed Kornheiser as an egotistical sportswriter trying to get his way at a hotel check-in desk and saying the line in his young adult novel Last Shot: A Final Four Mystery. The portrayal of Kornheiser in this negative light is the source of some ill will between him and Feinstein.
 Dr. HOF-WOF: A self-reverential honorific Tony gave to himself to indicate he had been give an honorary Doctor of Humane Letters by his alma mater Binghamton University, as well as being a member of the National Jewish Sports Hall of Fame (HOF) and the DC Sports Hall of Fame, which as he pointed out is really just a series of plaques on a wall (Wall of Fame - WOF) at Nationals Park.
Don't do it Tony!: A soundbite of Irish soccer announcer Tommy Smyth used to urge Kornheiser to have second thoughts. 
 Felix Cavaliere, Eddie Brigati, Gene Cornish, and Dino Danelli: Kornheiser asserts that since he is able to recite the names of the original members of the 1960s rock band The Rascals on cue he thereore possess abilities that most other humans do not. 
 Gallantry: A ridiculous superlative bestowed upon lower level college athletes that performed incredibly without the expectation of media praise or national recognition. Originally coined by John Feinstein when referring to athletes in the Patriot League without a hint of self-awareness. 
 Gary Math: The concept in which co-host Gary Braun is able to create his own mathematical reality. Every time a mathematical figure is needed on the show, Braun will instantly chime in with an intentional wrong answer. This also extends to numerical concepts he advances, such as "Everything has a 50/50 chance of happening, either it does or it doesn't."
 Go measure my penis and let me get on the airplane: James Carville's answer to Kornheiser's question (January 8, 2010) about full-body scanners being installed at airports in the wake of the Northwest Airlines Flight 253 bomb scare. The quote became an instant hit over the blogosphere later that day (and was even featured in a Saturday Night Live Weekend Update segment), and has since been re-played on the radio show.
 The hardest thing in the galaxy!: A facetious reference to Washington Nationals outfielder Jayson Werth's assertion that he could "figure out how to do algorithms" because hitting a baseball in MLB is "literally the hardest thing to do. If you can do the hardest thing, you can do anything else . . . There’s nothing harder in the galaxy."
 I Have a Piano: A brief, nonsensical, and out of tune song written and performed by listener, Tony Beeson. The melody consists of Beeson randomly plinking piano keys while the lyrics describe his possession of a piano and lack of ability and talent to play it. Kornheiser connects with the ethos of the piece via his similar possession of a piano and complete lack of musical ability. 
 If you're out on your bike tonight, do wear white: Kornheiser's signature sign-off, which is from the Rolling Stones' song, "Something Happened To Me Yesterday."
 Ingleside: A retirement community near Rock Creek Park in DC that his son Michael jokes about taking Tony to when he does something that indicates the possible onset of senility.
 It's a television show: Tony's insistence that all sports is produced to get television ratings and the actual athletic competition is secondary.
Jesus, am I speaking Chinese?: A soundbite of Cleveland Cavaliers coach Paul Silas who vas visibly aggravated by a reporter relentlessly asking him about an altercation with player Eric Snow.  
Jesus wept The stock answer Kornheiser gives when another author asks him to pen a testimonial blurb for their book cover. 
Jingles: The jingles are the brief parody songs created and submitted by listeners and played by the show prior to the mailbag segment near the conclusion of the show. Jingles typically consist of the music from popular songs replaced with new songs referring to amusing parts of recent show episodes. The jingles are written, recorded, produced, and performed by a network of Loyal Littles dubbed The Jinglers. Social meetings of The Jinglers take place at regulaly held Jinglefests typically held at DC-area bars. 
 The John Wooden Story: A reference to John Feinstein repeatedly telling a dubiously truthful story about meeting John Wooden and his wife in a hotel lobby where everyone stood up and gave them a standing ovation until they reached the elevator.
 Johnnie Walker Blue : The premium blend of Johnnie Walker Scotch whisky. It is often used by Kornheiser as the hallmark of status to have Johnnie Walker Blue Label on hand. 
 Junior!!!: A sound clip of Sean Connery exclaiming "Junior!!!" from Indiana Jones and the Last Crusade which would be played anyone referred to John Feinstein. Feinstein reportedly hated the nickname Kornheiser had given to him and the show would playfully ridicule him with additional sound clips that would become part of the show including someone interviewing him opining "Wow, John Feinstein!" or Feinstein himself repeating "This book is devastating" in reference to his own work.
 Kornheiser, 71: A reference to a Washington Post article from 2019, where writer Cindy Boren quickly states Kornheiser's age in the first paragraph. Tony took issue with this clear and obvious display of his age that he quickly called for research into her age so that he could enact revenge by referring to her as Boren, "Age".
 La Cheeserie!: A reference to the cheese counter in Calvert Woodley Wines & Spirits in Washington, DC. Owned by the family of regular show guest Steve Sands, Littles started yelling it at Sands at golf tournaments around the world. People also began to yell it after golfers' shots, hoping to be heard on TV. The most notable was a cry of La Cheeserie! being heard live on TV during the 2016 Rio Olympics golf tournament. Today, it is frequently yelled by fans to all show regulars, not just Sands, as a way for Loyal Littles to identify themselves to Bigs. In a recent notable instance of the phrase's invocation, Loyal Little Rick Devens shouted 'La Cheeserie!' after winning a challenge on the American reality game show Survivor.
 Lace: The self-anointed nickname of co-host Chris Cillizza. Likely a reference to a female combatant on American Gladiators.
 Les Boulez: Kornheiser's long time nickname for the Washington Wizards formerly the Washington Bullets. Tony also invented the "Curse of Les Boulez" to describe the circumstances of the perennially hard done by franchise. 
 The Little House: The smaller house located immediately next to Kornehiser's home in Washington, D.C. He purchased the home in the hopes that his son Michael would move next door. However, Michael has long resisted these overtures and the house has remained vacant for nearly a decade. It is now a frequent viewing spot for local urban wildlife.
 Lillehammer Jacket: A very large insulated coat that Kornheiser only breaks out of the closet when the temperature reaches single digits. The Lillehammer Jacket was originally procured when Tony traveled to cover the 1994 Winter Olympics in Lillehammer, Norway.
 Loyal Littles/Bigs: Loyal Littles are the regular people that listen to the show, Bigs are the people associated with the show or in Tony's personal world (hosts, co-hosts, guests, producers, friends, relations etc.)
 Loomis Chaffee School for the Rich: The nickname Chris Cilizza gave to the prep school where he spent his formative years, the Loomis Chaffee School in Connecticut.
  Malibu Rum: Malibu Rum is the preferred alcoholic beverage of co-host Chris Cillizza for all occasions. 
 Mr. Porthouser: The name that Barbara Bush mistakenly called Kornheiser upon meeting him in 1991.
 My side of the street: Kornheiser's reference during politically sensitive discussions to his identity as a relatively wealthy, Jewish, Democratic-leaning male.
 News Channel 8: A fictitious TV news network that Kornheiser occasionally references as simulcasting the show.
 No, we're not gonna f@*king do Stonehenge!!!: A soundbite of actor Michael McKean from the film This is Spinal Tap that is used when someone asks an irrelevant question. 
 Now, where's the cake?: A sound bite of a confused Washington Wizards owner Abe Pollin calling for a ceremonial cake to appear during an impromptu celebration honoring the selection of Gilbert Arenas and Antawn Jamison to the NBA All-Star Game. 
 The Orchid: Kornheiser's nickname for Washington Nationals pitcher Stephen Strasburg due to the fact that he is seemingly delicate and only able to perform in perfect weather conditions, much like an actual orchid. 
 The Palm: Located south of Dupont Circle The Palm's DC location is seemingly the only restaurant that Kornheiser frequents. It is apparent he prefers it primarily for the interaction among his social circle as he often mentions he either doesn't eat or only gets half an entree. Loyal Littles and Bigs often leave notes or send mail to Kornheiser at this location.
 Old People's Network (OPN): A fictitious network that broadcasts programming geared for elderly men and women. Viagra and Geritol commercials are frequently seen on the network.
 The person to whom I am related by marriage: Kornheiser's most commonly used politically correct term for his wife, Karril.
 Phil's Mom: Phil Ceppaglia's real-life mother, who calls the show before the start of the NCAA Men's Basketball Tournament to pick the winners of each game.  She is famous for picking teams that have little to no chance of winning, not knowing where many of the schools are located, using flawed logic (or none at all) to pick winners, and for mispronouncing the team names. In 2006 she blindly picked George Mason, a Cinderella team no one expected to even make the 2006 NCAA Men's Basketball Tournament, to win the National Championship.  Due to George Mason's stunning run through the tournament wherein they advanced to the Final Four, her pick turned out to be far more accurate than anyone thought, which led to Tony's listeners jumping on the bandwagon and proclaiming that they "Roll with Phil's Mom".
 Purple Line: A reference to the Maryland Transit Administration's currently under-construction light-rail transit Purple Line. The project is a direct and ongoing subject of Kornheiser's ire since it is being built directly though the golf course at the private Columbia Country Club, of which Kornheiser is a member, along with Barack Obama, Michael Wilbon, and many others in his social circle.
 The Quintessential American Sportswriter: Kornheiser's nickname for sportswriter Bob Ryan.
 Refugee Safeway: A Safeway on Connecticut Avenue in Chevy Chase, DC that Kornheiser has referred to as the refugee Safeway because of the patrons and general state of the store. There are occasional references to other similarly monikered Safeways in the DC area, such as the Soviet Safeway and the Social Safeway.
 Reginald the Monkey: A fictitious monkey used as a front to present Marc 'Nigel' Sterne's weekly NFL picks. Reginald's picks are included every week to use as a seemingly random barometer against other more professional prognosticators, such as Ron Jaworski, Jeff Ma, Chuck Todd, or James Carville. Every week the picks are presented in a manner where Nigel goes to the Smithsonian National Zoological Park to visit Reginald, where he gives Nigel the picks by regaling him with his stories and photos of past meetings with various celebrities.
 Send me a box of that: A catch phrase developed by Kornheiser to indicate he'd like to be sent a box of desired merchandise (by either sponsors or a friend or listener of the show) free of charge. This has resulted in him receiving “tribute” ranging from Skechers sneakers, to golf equipment, to cases of wine, to foods like gummi bears, ice cream, and pretzels, and anything else in between he expresses an affinity for. 
 The Sheehan Boys: The sons of former show newsman Kevin Sheehan that Kornheiser would contract for residential snow removal services. Payment for these services was often rendered in autographed Pardon the Interruption hats and shirts.
 The Smartest Man in Washington: Kornheiser's nickname for defense attorney Abbe Lowell. 
 Spike and Ike: The twin sons of co-host Gary Braun.
 The Show Killer: The nickname given by Kornheiser to producer Phil Ceppaglia when he botched his call screening duties in 1998. The nickname was amplified when Ceppaglia moved to the Dan Patrick Show and has stuck with Ceppaglia his near 25-year career at ESPN Radio.   
 Stop the hammering! A soundbite of MSNBC host Lawrence O'Donnell repeatedly imploring his crew to find an unattributed hammering noise happening somewhere on his set. Most often used to indicate something is driving Tony nuts. 
 Talismans and Amulets: Kornheiser has a well known fear of flying but will fly on a commercial flight given that he can be medicated and be given special treatment by meeting the pilot personally prior to takeoff. He also travels with a variety of good luck trinkets that he refers to as "Talismans and Amulets". He also has a very worn shirt that he superstitiously wears on flights, that he refers to as his "Flying Shirt" that eventually met its end on a trip to Augusta National Golf Club in 2017.
 Tell Michael: A reference to Kornheiser's son, Michael. After Kornheiser told his listeners a story of a rainy day when he texted Michael to ask if it was raining where Michael was also, listeners started emailing the weather where they were, telling Tony to "tell Michael."
 This Show Stinks: Kornheiser's self-deprecation about his show.  The show's past and present email addresses, thisshowstinks@espnradio.com, thisshowstinks@sportstalk980.com, thisshowstinks@washpost.com, thisshowstinks@3wtradio.com, and now thisshowstinks@espn980.com are based on this catch phrase.  Note that thisshowstinks@espnradio.com was actually selected by his listeners. It has since been adopted as the podcast's dormant Twitter handle.
 TK Salute: Kornheiser's reference for giving someone the middle finger. Listeners of the show are encouraged to greet each other using the required salute, especially when spotting a TK bumper sticker on another car. 
 Tuesdays, I'm Laurie: The purported original title for Kornheiser's 2002 book I'm Back for More Cash, on the cover of which he planned to appear in drag. The title was intended to be a play on the title of his friend Mitch Albom's bestseller Tuesdays with Morrie.
 Unnamed Daughter: A reference to co-host Torie Clarke's daughter that at times does not seem to exist since she is constantly only referring to the lives and exploits of her two sons.
 Well, I certainly hope you'll die soon: A soundbite of actor Peter Hackes from the film Broadcast News that is used to wish ill will on someone. 
 We'll do it live! F@*k it! Do it live! A soundbite of news personality Bill O'Reilly melting down at his producers on the set of Inside Edition. The clip is used most often when talking about the complications than can arise while doing both recorded and live broadcasting. Kornheiser holds some disdain for O'Reilly after he witnessed him being obnoxiously loud on an Amtrak Acela train for the entire journey between New York and Washington, D.C.
 Wha' Happened?: A soundbite of actor Fred Willard from the film A Mighty Wind used to express lack of surprise for events that are not unexpected. 
 Wilbon's not surprised: An often highlighted circumstance where Michael Wilbon fails to express lack of surprise despite the unlikelihood of an event or outcome. 
 Winter Weather Forecast: An annual tradition where former newsman Kevin Sheehan gives a bloviating and long-winded overly-specific prediction of winter weather events in the DC area for the upcoming season, usually given in the November–December time frame. The segment is punctuated with a multitude of sponsor breaks related to weather terminology, NHL scores where he uses different weather euphemisms for one team beating another, overly-complicated digestions of various weather models (NAM, GFS, Euro, etc.),  testimonials from his vast network of "weather-watchers", and recaps of his discussions with his DC-area professional weather predicting "colleagues".

See also
 List of ESPN Radio personalities

References and notes

External links
 
 The Tony Kornheiser Show on ESPN 980
 The Tony Kornheiser Show on 3WT Radio
 The Tony Kornheiser Show Podcasts on 3WT Radio and Washington Post Radio
 This Website Stinks! An Unofficial Tony Kornheiser Website Dedicated to Tony Kornheiser's Radio Show. Includes Andy Polley's Happy Fun Time Message Board Extravaganza!

American sports radio programs
Radio programs on XM Satellite Radio